Promicromonospora thailandica is a bacterium from the genus Promicromonospora which has been isolated from marine sediments from the Andaman Sea in Thailand.

References

External links
Type strain of Promicromonospora thailandica at BacDive -  the Bacterial Diversity Metadatabase	

Micrococcales
Bacteria described in 2012